Trichoclea was a genus of moths of the family Noctuidae. It is now considered a synonym of Anarta.

Former species
 Trichoclea antica Smith, 1891
 Trichoclea decepta Grote, 1883
 Trichoclea edwardsii Smith, 1888
 Trichoclea florida (Smith, 1900)
 Trichoclea postica Smith, 1891

Placed in Sideridis
 Trichoclea artesta is now Sideridis artesta (Smith, 1903)
 Trichoclea fuscolutea is now Sideridis fuscolutea (Smith, 1892)
 Trichoclea mojave is now Sideridis mojave Benjamin, 1932
 Trichoclea ruisa is now Sideridis ruisa Forbes, 1913
 Trichoclea uscripta is now Sideridis uscripta (Smith, 1891)
 Trichoclea vindemialis is now Sideridis vindemialis (Guenée, 1852)

References
Natural History Museum Lepidoptera genus database
Trichoclea at funet

Hadeninae